1041 Asta, provisional designation , is a carbonaceous background asteroid from the outer regions of the asteroid belt, approximately 57 kilometers in diameter. It was discovered on 22 March 1925, by German astronomer Karl Reinmuth at the Heidelberg Observatory in southwest Germany. The asteroid was likely named after Danish actress Asta Nielsen.

Orbit and classification 

Asta is a non-family asteroid from the main belt's background population. It orbits the Sun in the outer main-belt at a distance of 2.6–3.5 AU once every 5 years and 5 months (1,968 days; semi-major axis of 3.07 AU). Its orbit has an eccentricity of 0.14 and an inclination of 14° with respect to the ecliptic.

Physical characteristics 

In the SMASS classification, Asta is a carbonaceous C-type asteroid. Pan-STARRS photometric survey also characterizes the asteroid as a C-type.

Rotation period 

Photometric observations of Asta collected at the Australian Oakley Southern Sky Observatory and the U.S. Oakley Observatory in October 2008 show a rotation period of 7.99 hours with a brightness variation of 0.22 magnitude. In February 2010, a refined lightcurve with a period of 7.554 hours and an amplitude of 0.14 magnitude was obtained by French amateur astronomer Pierre Antonini, who also mentioned the possibility of an alternative period solution.

Diameter and albedo 

According to the surveys carried out by the Japanese Akari satellite and the NEOWISE mission of NASA's Wide-field Infrared Survey Explorer, Asta measures between 43.46 and 61.852 kilometers in diameter and its surface has an albedo between 0.0421 and 0.08.

The Collaborative Asteroid Lightcurve Link derives an albedo of 0.0493 and a diameter of 57.16 kilometers based on an absolute magnitude of 10.1.

Naming 

This minor planet was likely named after Danish actress Asta Nielsen (1881–1972), according to research by the author of the Dictionary of Minor Planet Names, Lutz Schmadel (LDS). The naming was proposed by ARI-astronomer Gustav Stracke.

References

External links 
 Asteroid Lightcurve Database (LCDB), query form (info )
 Dictionary of Minor Planet Names, Google books
 Asteroids and comets rotation curves, CdR – Observatoire de Genève, Raoul Behrend
 Discovery Circumstances: Numbered Minor Planets (1)-(5000) – Minor Planet Center
 
 

001041
Discoveries by Karl Wilhelm Reinmuth
Named minor planets
001041
19250322